HMV's Poll of Polls was an annual list of albums compiled by British music retailer HMV from 1998 to 2012. The listing was created each December by collating year-end polls from approximately 30 music magazines, newspapers and guides to determine the most critically acclaimed albums of the year. An album's placing in the list was determined by the number of different polls in which it was included. In the event of two records featuring in the same number of polls, the album with the highest combined placings was given the higher position on the Poll of Polls. In 2011, Let England Shake by PJ Harvey was named the best album of the year after receiving 21 nominations – the following year, Channel Orange by Frank Ocean topped the poll with 22 nominations.

The Poll of Polls was introduced by HMV in 1998, with Hello Nasty by American hip hop group Beastie Boys topping the first chart. Thereafter, the poll was aggregated using listings from more than 60 sources, including magazines such as NME and Q, newspapers such as The Guardian and the Daily Mirror, and music blogs, including Gorilla vs. Bear and Stereogum. Subsequent polls were topped by acts such as Daft Punk, Queens of the Stone Age and Kanye West. The only act to top the listing more than once was Canadian band Arcade Fire, who were number one in both 2005 and 2010 with Funeral and The Suburbs respectively.

Commentators observed a disparity between the albums that placed highly in the Poll of Polls and those that were the year's biggest-selling. Speaking about the 2008 chart, singer-songwriter Christopher Rees noted that "when records are so popular in mainstream charts, they lose favour with the critics. The quirkier the sound, the cooler it becomes in their opinion." Similarly, Jonathan Owen of The Independent contrasted the albums that had been featured in 2011's Poll of Polls against those that had sold the most that year in the UK. Although Let England Shake had topped HMV's listing, Owen remarked that "hardly anyone would agree", as Harvey's album had, at the time, sold only 130,000 copies, compared with 3.5 million copies of the year's best-seller, 21 by Adele.

Albums released through independent (indie) record labels often performed well in the poll. In discussion of the 2008 chart, John Rostron of Cardiff's The Point remarked that he had "seen a rise in the quality of independent music and of bands signed to small record labels". The following year, eight of Top 10 albums had been released by indie labels, which HMV claimed underlined "the current strength of Indie music and the vitality of the music scene in general". Three years later, 34 of the 50 albums in the chart were released on independent labels, with six featuring in the Top 10. Speaking in 2009, HMV's Rock & Pop Manager John Hirst stated that it was "encouraging to see indie labels doing so well", and that it reflected on "the vibrant state of [music] right now".

Number-one albums

Year-end polls used
HMV's Poll of Polls used year-end, best-of charts from 30 major UK music magazines, national newspapers, websites and guides. Since its inception in 1998, the chart was collated using data from:
Magazines

Artrocker
The Big Issue
Clash
Classic Rock
Decibel
DJ Mag
Echoes
Fact
Filter
The Fly
Gay Times
GQ
Hot Press
iDJ
Kerrang!
Magnet
Melody Maker
Metal Hammer
Mixmag
Mojo
Music Week
Muzik
NME
Paste
Q
The Quietus
Record Collector
Rock Sound
Rolling Stone
Select
Spin
Time
Time Out
Uncut
The Wire (Rewind)
The Word

Newspapers

Daily Mail
Daily Mirror
Daily Star
Evening Standard
The Guardian
Metro
Observer Music Monthly
The Sun
The Sunday Times
The Times

Websites and other organisations

Amazon
BBC Radio 6 Music
Digital Spy
Drowned in Sound
Get Closer
Gorilla vs. Bear
HMV
Piccadilly Records
Pitchfork
Playlouder
Popbitch
PopMatters
Pure Groove
Rough Trade
Stereogum
XFM

See also
Websites that also aggregate annual lists of albums from year-end polls
AnyDecentMusic?
Metacritic

Notes

1998 establishments in the United Kingdom
British music industry
Lists of albums
Polling
Annual events in the United Kingdom
2012 disestablishments in the United Kingdom
Recurring events disestablished in 2012
Recurring events established in 1998